Pavel Svojanovský (born 12 August 1943) is a retired Czech rower who mostly competed in the coxed pairs, together with his younger brother Oldřich Svojanovský. With different coxswains they won two Olympic (1972 and 1976), one world (1974) and two European championship medals (1969 and 1971). They also placed fifth in the eights at the 1968 Olympics.

References

External links

 

1943 births
Living people
People from Otrokovice
Czech male rowers
Czechoslovak male rowers
Olympic rowers of Czechoslovakia
Rowers at the 1968 Summer Olympics
Rowers at the 1972 Summer Olympics
Rowers at the 1976 Summer Olympics
Olympic silver medalists for Czechoslovakia
Olympic bronze medalists for Czechoslovakia
Olympic medalists in rowing
Medalists at the 1976 Summer Olympics
Medalists at the 1972 Summer Olympics
World Rowing Championships medalists for Czechoslovakia
European Rowing Championships medalists
Sportspeople from the Zlín Region